Valencia Country Club is an 18-hole golf course in the Valencia neighborhood in Santa Clarita, California. The course is a Robert Trent Jones design and was established in 1965.

In 1998, the course hosted the Los Angeles Open. Major champion and golf course architect Fuzzy Zoeller said, "Honest to God, from tee to green, this course is great". The course took over duties as the host in 1998 as permanent host Riviera Country Club was the venue for the 1998 United States Senior Open.

Valencia Country Club also hosted the Champions Tour event the AT&T Champions Classic from 2001-2009.

References

Golf clubs and courses in California
1965 establishments in California
Sports venues completed in 1965